All the King's Horses is the second album by American saxophonist Grover Washington Jr. It was recorded in 1972 and released on Kudu Records the same year. In 2008, it was reissued on CD by Verve/GRP Records.

Track listing

"No Tears, in the End" (Ralph MacDonald, William Salter) – 3:50
"All the King's Horses" (Aretha Franklin) – 3:48
"Where Is the Love" (Ralph MacDonald, William Salter) – 5:07
"Body and Soul (Montage)" (Edward Heyman, Frank Eyton, Johnny Green) – 3:04
"Lean on Me" (Bill Withers) – 4:25
"Lover Man" (Jimmy Davis, James Sherman, Ram Ramirez) – 7:02
"Love Song 1700" (Henry Purcell) – 4:49

Personnel 
 Grover Washington Jr. – alto saxophone, tenor saxophone, alto saxophone solo (4, 6), tenor saxophone solo (7)
 Bob James – electric piano, harpsichord, arrangements and conductor
 Richard Tee – organ
 Gene Bertoncini – guitar
 Cornell Dupree – guitar
 Eric Gale – guitar solo (1-5, 7)
 David Spinozza – guitar solo (6)
 Gordon Edwards – bass (1)
 Ron Carter – bass (2-7)
 Bernard Purdie – drums (1, 2, 5)
 Billy Cobham – drums (4, 6, 7)
 Airto Moreira – percussion
 Ralph MacDonald – congas
 Marvin Stamm – trumpet solo (6), flugelhorn solo (6)

Brass and Woodwind Section
 George Marge – alto saxophone, flute, English horn, oboe, recorder
 Pepper Adams – baritone saxophone
 Arthur Clarke – baritone saxophone, flute
 Wayne Andre, Paul Faulise, Tony Studd – trombone 
 Jon Faddis, John Frosk, Marky Markowitz, Ernie Royal, Alan Rubin, Marvin Stamm, Snooky Young – trumpet, flugelhorn
 Ray Alonge, Donald Corrado, Fred Klein, Brooks Tillotson – French horn

String Section
 Charles McCracken and George Ricci – cello
 Margaret Ross – harp
 Richard Dickler, Emanuel Vardi – viola
 Alexander Cores, Bernard Eichen, Max Ellen, Paul Gershman, Emanuel Green, Harold Kohon, Harry Lookofsky, Joe Malin, David Nadien, Gene Orloff, John Pintaualle, Irving Spice – violin
String Trio (Tracks 4, 6 & 7)
 George Ricci – cello
 Emanuel Vardi – viola
 David Nadien – violin

Production 
 Creed Taylor – producer 
 Rudy Van Gelder – engineer 
 Bob Ciano – album design 
 Pete Turner – photography

References

Kudu Records albums
Grover Washington Jr. albums
1972 albums
albums produced by Creed Taylor